Wired is a 2008 three-part television miniseries starring Jodie Whittaker, Laurence Fox and Toby Stephens. It debuted on ITV at 9:00pm on Monday, 13 October 2008, and was shown over three consecutive weeks. The complete series was released on DVD on 10 November 2008.

Plot
Single mother and bank employee Louise Evans (Jodie Whittaker) finds herself blackmailed by a former bank employee with documents reveal that she and a former partner stole £3,000 from a former employer. The boyfriend of her best friend, Philip Manningham (Laurence Fox), plans to defraud £250m from ZBG Banking, the company from which he was sacked, and after he threatens Louise she agrees to help him pull off an Internet scam. Meanwhile, Detective Crawford Hill (Toby Stephens) is working undercover in an attempt to expose the fraud ring and after a chance meeting with Louise, he realises she is involved and is key to him cracking the case. However, their relationship soon threatens to compromise everything and places Louise in mortal danger.

Cast
 Jodie Whittaker as Louise Evans
 Laurence Fox as Philip Manningham
 Toby Stephens as DI Crawford Hill
 Riz Ahmed as Manesh Kunzru
 Charlie Brooks as Anna Hansen
 Sacha Dhawan as Ben Chandrakar
 Ramon Tikaram as Yusuf Ralindi
 Iain McKee as Nick Benson
 Katy Cavanagh as DS Polly Stuart
 Helena Fox as Erica Wilson

Episodes

References

External links

2008 British television series debuts
2008 British television series endings
2000s British drama television series
ITV television dramas
2000s British television miniseries
Television series by ITV Studios
Television shows produced by Granada Television
English-language television shows
Television shows set in Liverpool
Television shows set in Manchester